The Minister of Defence of Denmark is the politically appointed head of the Danish Ministry of Defence. The Minister of Defence is responsible for the Danish armed forces, the Danish Defence Intelligence Service and the Danish Emergency Management Agency. 

The Minister of Defence follows the directions given by the Prime Minister of Denmark and the decisions of the Folketing. The Danish Defence Law designates in article 9 the Minister of Defence as the supreme authority in Defence. Under the Minister is the Chief of Defence, the senior-ranking professional military officer heading the Defence Command, who commands the Army, the Navy, the Air Force and other units not reporting directly to the Ministry of Defence.

The main responsibilities of the Minister of Defence are to prevent armed conflicts and war, to safeguard the sovereignty of Denmark and integrity of Danish territory and to promote global peace and stability. Since 2002 these responsibilities have included the political leadership of the Danish contribution to the NATO led International Security Assistance Force (ISAF) in Afghanistan.

The current Defence Minister is Jakob Ellemann-Jensen. He simultaneously serves as Deputy Prime Minister.

History
In 1905, the offices of the Minister of the Navy and the Minister of War were merged to create the current office of Defence Minister.

See also
Commander-in-chief#Denmark
List of Minister of Defence (Denmark)

References

Government ministerial offices of Denmark
 
Naval ministers
Denmark